The siege of Lingen of 1605 took place between 10 August and 19 August 1605, at Lingen, District of Emsland, Lower Saxony, between Spain and the United Provinces, during the Eighty Years' War.   Prince Maurice of Nassau tried to preserve Lingen at all costs. The Dutch garrison led by Captain Maerten Cobben, expecting to be aided by Maurice's army, held out for nine days, but were finally forced to surrender. The siege was part of Spinola's successful campaign of 1605–1606.

Background
After the devastating siege of Ostend, on 2 July 1605, the Dutch headquarters received reports that Don Ambrosio Spinola with Spain's main army of Flanders was headed towards the strongholds of the Rhine, in Cologne. Maurice and his commanders, who had been secretly planning to lay siege to Antwerp, had to abandon all hope. The movements of Ambrosio Spinola not only prevented the Dutch troops from landing near Antwerp, but also forced the Dutch to abandon their attempt to capture other minor towns. The States-General, alarmed by the Spanish advance, ordered Prince Maurice to head for the Rhine with all of his troops.

Spinola's army was initially estimated between 7,000 or 9,000 infantry and 3,000 cavalry, but a few days later, the new Dutch reports estimated the Spaniards numbered about 16,000–17,000 men.  At the end of July, leaving behind 50 infantry companies to guard Ijzendijke, Maurice quickly moved the rest of his army, including 61 infantry companies and 6 cavalry companies, towards Deventer.  He arrived there on 10 August.  Two days earlier, on 8 August, Spinola reached and laid siege the fortified town of Oldenzaal. The Dutch garrison surrendered to the Spaniards the next day. On the same day, Spinola's army marched on Lingen.

Siege of Lingen

On 10 August, the Spanish army laid siege to Lingen. The news that Oldenzaal had fallen, and that Spinola was marching on Lingen, reached the Dutch headquarters in the same day.

The fortress-town of Lingen was defended by a garrison of about 500 or 1,000 Dutch soldiers under Captain Maerten Cobben, plus the town militia.  Expecting that Prince Maurice would come to their aid, they tried to hold out against the siege for nine days.  Spinola in the end the expected relief from Prince Maurice did not arrive in time.  Spinola compelled the garrison to surrender, and the town fell on 19 August.

Aftermath
The loss of Lingen led to serious disquiet in the Dutch headquarters, and Prince Maurice had to opt for a defensive strategy. He marched with 12,000 to 13,000 men on 30 August to the towns threatened by Spinola, posting garrisons with total strength of 8,100 men, in Deventer, Zutphen, Zwolle, Rheinberg, Bredevoort, and Groenlo. In mid-September Spinola fell back to the Rhine, crossing the river, took Mülheim an der Ruhr, and laid siege to Wachtendonk on 8 October. On 9 October Dutch troops led by Frederick Henry and Prince Maurice launched an attack against the Spanish troops at Mülheim an der Ruhr, but were repelled and defeated by the Spanish. Wachtendonk fell into Spanish hands on 28 October, and on 8 November, Krakau Castle also was taken by Spinola.  Dutch and the Spanish troops then settled into winter quarters in late November ending the season's campaigning.

See also
 Army of Flanders
 Twelve Years' Truce
 Eighty Years' War
 Johan van Oldenbarnevelt
 States-General of the Netherlands

Notes

References
Van Nimwegen, Olaf. The Dutch Army and the Military Revolutions 1588-1688. First published 2010. The Boydell Press, Woodbridge. 
 Rodríguez Villa, Antonio. Ambrosio Spínola, Primer Marqués de los Balbases. Estab. tip. de Fortanet 1905.
 Narración de los sucesos principales de la historia de España, desde el año 1600 hasta 1808. Library of the University of Wisconsin. Madrid. 1828.
 Black, Jeremy. European Warfare 1494-1660. Routledge Publishing (2002) 
 Mariana, Juan. Historia General de España. Last edition. 1600 hasta 1833. Volume 9. Barcelona. 1839.
 Luc Duerloo. Dynasty and Piety: Archduke Albert (1598-1621) and Habsburg Political Culture in an Age of Religious Wars. MPG Books Group. UK.
 Irvine Israel, Jonathan. Conflicts of Empires: Spain, the Low Countries and the struggle for world supremacy 1585-1713. Continuum International Publishing Group. 

Lingen
Lingen
Lingen
1605 in Europe
Conflicts in 1605
1605 in the Holy Roman Empire
Eighty Years' War (1566–1609)